Guido delle Colonne (in Latin Guido de Columnis or de Columna) was a 13th-century Italian judge and writer, who lived in Messina. He is the author of a prose narrative of the Trojan War entitled Historia destructionis Troiae ("History of the destruction of Troy," 1287),  that was based on De excidio Trojae historia written by Dares Phrygius and Ephemeridos belli Trojani written by Dictys Cretensis.

Dante (De vulgari eloquentia 2.5) named Guido as a poet in the vernacular, and five poems by him in Italian survive.

Further reading
 Guido delle Colonne, Historia destructionis Troiae, edited by Nathaniel Edward Griffin, Mediaeval Academy of America Publication 26, Cambridge, Mass.: Mediaeval Academy of America, 1936. 
 Benson, C. David, The History of Troy in Middle English Literature: Guido delle Colonne's Historia Destructionis Troiae in Medieval England, Rowman & Littlefield (1980), 
 Carlesso, Giuliana, “La fortuna della Historia destructionis Troiae di Guido delle Colonne e un volgarizzamento finora ignoto,” Giornale storico della letteratura italiana 157 (1980): 230-51.
 Chiàntera, Raffaele, Guido delle Colonne: Poeta e storico latino del sec. XIII e il problema della lingua della nostra primitiva lirica d'arte, Napoli: Casa Editrice ‘Federico & Adria' di P. Federico, 1956.
 Keller, Wolfram R., Selves and Nations: The Troy Story from Sicily to England in the Middle Ages, Heidelberg: Universitätsverlag Winter, 2008.
 Lumiansky, R. M., “The Story of Troilus and Briseida according to Benoit and Guido,” Speculum 29.4 (1954): 727-33.

Notes

References
 
 Guido de Columnis vs Heinrich Schliemann -- water courses in Aegean prehistory, article online at Luwian Studies (access date: 2 February 2017)

External links
 

13th-century Latin writers
Italian poets
Italian male poets
Sicilian School poets
13th-century Italian writers
13th-century Italian jurists
13th-century Italian poets